was a Japanese botanist. Kanehira undertook botanical expeditions into Taiwan, Peru, Palau, Kiribati, the Northern Mariana Islands, the Federated States of Micronesia, the Philippines, and Papua New Guinea as well as describing the flora of Japan. His main collection and types are held at the herbarium of Kyushu University, with duplicate specimens distributed to A, B, BO, BISH, FU, GH, K, L, LA, NY, P, PNH, TI, US, and Z (Index Herbariorum acronyms).

References 

 Brummitt, RK; EC Powell. 1992.  Authors of Plant Names . Royal Botanic Gardens, Kew.

External links 

 Smithsonian Institution Libraries

20th-century Japanese botanists
1882 births
1948 deaths